John Fifita (born 28 July 1959) is a Tongan former professional rugby league footballer who represented Tonga in the 1986 Pacific Cup and played as a professional in England and Australia.

Playing career
Fifita played for the St George Dragons between 1984 and 1990, starting in 76 first grade matches for the club.

In 1986 Fifita was part of the Tonga side that competed in the 1986 Pacific Cup. He was named in the team of the tournament. He again represented Tonga at the 1988 Pacific Cup.

In the 1987/88 off-season Fifita travelled to England and played for the Castleford (Heritage № 663) club.

Fifita played right-, i.e. number 12, in Castleford's 12-12 draw with Bradford Northern in the 1987 Yorkshire County Cup Final during the 1987–88 season at Headingley Rugby Stadium, Leeds on Saturday 17 October 1987, and played right-, i.e. number 10, (replaced by Interchange Dean Sampson) in the 2-11 defeat by Bradford Northern in the 1987 Yorkshire County Cup Final replay during the 1987–88 season at Elland Road, Leeds on Saturday 31 October 1987.

References

External links

1959 births
Living people
Castleford Tigers players
Rugby league props
Rugby league second-rows
St. George Dragons players
Tonga national rugby league team players
Tongan rugby league players